Biocatalysis & Biotransformation is an academic journal that provides coverage of the application, both actual and potential of biological catalysts, including whole cells or isolated components thereof, natural and modified enzymes and catalytic antibodies for the synthesis, interconversion or degradation of chemical species.  It is published by Informa Healthcare.

Core areas 

Coverage includes:

 Mechanistic, principles, kinetics and thermodynamics of biocatalytic processes
 The chemical or genetic modification of biocatalysts
 Metabolic engineering
 Activity and stability of biocatalysts in non-aqueous and multi-phasic environments
 Environmental applications of biocatalysis

Editor-in-chief 
David Leak is the editor-in-chief of Biocatalysis & Biotransformation.

Publication format 
Biocatalysis & Biotransformation publishes 6 issues per year in simultaneous print and online editions.

Subscribers to the electronic edition of Biocatalysis & Biotransformation receive access to the online archive, which dates back to 1987, as part of their subscription.

References

External links
Biocatalysis & Biotransformation homepage of Biocatalysis & Biotransformation

Biochemistry journals
Catalysts
Publications established in 1987